The Princess Bride may refer to:

The Princess Bride (novel), 1973 fantasy romance novel by American writer William Goldman
The Princess Bride (film), 1987 American film adaptation starring Cary Elwes and Robin Wright
The Princess Bride (soundtrack), a 1987 soundtrack for the film

See also

 King's Quest VII: The Princeless Bride